Mary Therese Cadorette (born March 31, 1957) is an American actress best known for playing Jack Tripper's live-in girlfriend, flight attendant Vicky Bradford, on the short-lived 1984 Three's Company spin-off Three's a Crowd.

Education 
Cadorette graduated with a BFA in Dramatic Arts and Theater from the University of Connecticut in 1979.

Television, theater and film credits 
In 1981, she was acting in commercials.  In 1984 the producers of Three's Company decided at the end of the 8th season that they would spin off a new show starring John Ritter with a love interest. Over 500 women auditioned for the love interest role who would be named Vicky Bradford. During auditions Ritter felt an immediate connection to Cadorette, who was cast as stewardess Vicky Bradford, and introduced in the Three's Company episode "Cupid Works Overtime". Cadorette as Vicky appeared in two more episodes of Three's Company before she began as a co-star in Three's a Crowd. The show lasted one season.

Cadorette performed in multiple dinner theatres with the USO.  She also spent three and a half years on Broadway as an understudy for the lead role of "Peggy Sawyer" in the Broadway musical 42nd Street. She later took over the role. In 1990 she landed the recurring role of Margaret Turner on Night Court.

Cadorette has been in multiple films, including Stewardess School and The Rat Pack. In the 1980s she was also seen on a number of game shows, including The $25,000 Pyramid, Super Password, and Body Language.

Later career/return to Connecticut 
In 1999, Cadorette left California and moved back home to Connecticut to take care of her mother who had suffered a stroke.  Her mother died eight years later.  She continues to act in local stage productions, such as playing Mrs. Gibbs in Our Town for Connecticut Repertory Theatre in 2011.

The Chapeau Rouge Dance Project 
Cadorette and two friends, whom she had known since they were in dance school as children, decided to take up dancing again and share their craft and experience. They formed "The Chapeau Rouge Dance Project," encouraging former, retired, (and often older) dance students to attend classes in the dance studio that they rented.

Nug and Bug Antique Collectibles 
In 2014, Cadorette opened an antique store in Granby, Connecticut, called Nug and Bug Antique Collectibles.

Personal life 
Cadorette married Michael Eisen in 1982. Later, she married William Harris, and went by the name Mary Cadorette-Harris. William Harris died on October 15, 2010.  On November 1, 2015, she married her childhood sweetheart Michael Daly, and is now known as Mary Cadorette-Daly.

Directorial credits/educational career
 
 In March 2011, Cadorette directed and choreographed Hairspray at Glastonbury High School in Glastonbury, Connecticut. 
 In March 2012, Cadorette directed and choreographed 42nd Street at Glastonbury High School utilizing some original Gower Champion choreography.
 In May 2013, Cadorette directed and choreographed Hairspray at the Greater Hartford Academy of the Arts in Hartford, Connecticut.

Other directorial/choreographical credits at the Greater Hartford Academy of the Arts include: A Day in Hollywood / A Night in the Ukraine  (December 2014) and West Side Story (May 2016)

Cadorette currently teaches ballet, Luigi Jazz, ensemble, and tap within the Musical Theater Department at the Greater Hartford Academy of the Arts in Hartford, Connecticut.

Filmography

References

External links

 

Living people
American film actresses
American musical theatre actresses
American stage actresses
American television actresses
Miss America 1976 delegates
Actresses from Hartford, Connecticut
University of Connecticut alumni
20th-century American actresses
People from East Hartford, Connecticut
1957 births